Aloneftis is a surname. Notable people with the surname include:

Efstathios Aloneftis (born 1983), Cypriot footballer
Giorgos Aloneftis (born 1976), Cypriot footballer